Khatsun Namkha Lekpa Gyaltsen (1305 - 1343), orthographic spelling , was a ruler of Sakya, which had a precedence position in Tibet under the Yuan dynasty. He reigned from 1325 to 1341, but was more prominent in religious than in worldly affairs, and his time saw the beginning of the decline of the Sakya hegemony in Tibet.

A divided heritage

Khatsun Namkha Lekpa Gyaltsen was one of the thirteen sons of the previous abbot-ruler of Sakya, Zangpo Pal. His mother was Macig Yon Dagmo. Shortly before the death of his father, his elder brother, the imperial preceptor Kunga Lotro Gyaltsen, made a division of his brothers into four branches who resided in four different palaces: Zhitog, Lhakhang, Rinchengang, and Ducho. Zangpo Pal died in 1323, and Khatsun, being the head of the Zhitog branch, was installed as upper ruler in 1325. The Yuan emperor Yesün Temür bestowed a seal and the title . Although he enjoyed considerable religious prestige, Khatsun's actual authority appears to have been quite limited. He is seldom mentioned in the chronicles. Yesün Temür tried to strengthen the position of Sakya by appointing his brother Sonam Zangpo as viceroy of the three  (regions) of Tibet: Kham, Amdo and Ü-Tsang. This, however, did not turn out to be particularly effective. A series of administrators handled the affairs of Tibet, although with varying success. During the tenure of Khatsun they were:

 Odzer Sengge (d. 1328/29)
 Gyalwa Zangpo (1328/29-1333)
 Wangchuk Pal (1333-1337)
 Sonam Pal (1337-1344)

Indian invasion in the Himalayas

During the tenure of Khatsun Namkha Lekpa Gyaltsen, Tibet may have been threatened by a military expedition dispatched by Muhammad ibn Tughluq, sultan of Delhi. According to the historian Firishta, "having heard of the great wealth of China, Muhammad Tughluq conceived the idea of subduing that empire; but in order to accomplish his design, it was necessary first to conquer the country of Himachal which lies between the borders of China and India." Himachal refers to Nepal and the lands on both sides of the Himalayas. The near-contemporary historian Ziauddin Barani, on the other side, states that the sultan strove to conquer the mountain of Kara-jal between Hind and China. Despite the warnings of his councilors, Muhammad ibn Tughluq sent a sizable army up to the north in 1337. Firishta relates that the Indians, greatly diminished by hardships, met a large Chinese army at the border and had to fall back, closely followed by the Chinese. On the retreat downhill the sultan's troops suffered terribly from heavy rains and attacks by mountain tribes. Just a few soldiers returned to Delhi, only to be executed by the enraged sultan. Modern historians, however, doubt that Muhammad ibn Tughluq actually entertained the fantastic plan to conquer Tibet and China, and believe that the expedition may have aimed at tribal groups in the far north, towards the border to Tibet.

Disintegration

Already in 1327 a serious conflict arose between the  Odzer Sengge and the Sakya see. However, representatives of the Karmapa sect managed to mediate between the parties. In 1335-36 the emperor Toghon Temür dispatched two officials to get a tighter grip on the situation in Tibet. They carried out an inspection and revision of the census and taxation, but their presence caused great discontent from the populace. Even more seriously, the Phagmodrupa myriarchy under its dynamic leader Changchub Gyaltsen fell out with the Yazang myriarchy over the border between the two. In order to stop the ambitious Phagmodrupa lord, the Sakya official Wangtson treacherously arrested Changchub Gyaltsen in 1336. Although the prisoner was released by the weak-willed  Sonam Pal after a while, the event made for future clashes. The abbot-ruler Khatsun had little or no part in the political trouble at the time. However, the Zhitog and Rinchengang branches of Sakya had a clash in 1341, and Khatsun was forced to step down, leaving the dignity to his brother Jamyang Donyo Gyaltsen. He  died two years later, and civil war flared up in Central Tibet shortly afterwards.

See also

 Tibet under Yuan rule
 History of Tibet
 Mongol Empire
 Sakya Trizin

References

1305 births
1343 deaths
Sakya Trizins